David (Tatu) Nissinen (22 August 1883 - 2 February 1966) was a Finnish agronomist and politician, born in Maaninka. He was a member of the Parliament of Finland from 1920 to 1922, representing the National Progressive Party.

References

1883 births
1966 deaths
People from Maaninka
People from Kuopio Province (Grand Duchy of Finland)
National Progressive Party (Finland) politicians
Members of the Parliament of Finland (1919–22)